Édouard Alletz (1798–1850) was a French diplomat.

Major publications
The dedication of French doctors and sisters of Saint-Camille, during the Yellow fever Barcelona "", Paris, Didot (1822)
Walpole, dramatic poem in three songs (1825)
Essay on Man, or Agreement of philosophy and religion (1826)
Sketches of mental distress (1828)
New Messiah, a poem (1830)
Poetic studies of the human heart (1832)
Picture of the general history of Europe since 1814 until 1830 (3 volumes, 1834) 
Poetic characters (1834)
Letter to M. de Lamartine on the truth of Christianity considered in its relations with the passions (1835)
Diseases of the century (1836) Online text
New Democracy, or Manners and power of the middle classes in France (2 volumes, 1837) 
Adventures of Alfonso Doria (2 volumes, 1838)
Political maxims for the use of the new democracy (1840)
Signs of the new spirit in parliament (1841) 
Poetical Sketches of Life (2 volumes, 1841)
Genius of the nineteenth century, or sketch of the progress of the human spirit since 1800 until today (1842 to 1843) 
Discourse on the power and downfall of the Republic of Venice (1842) 
Harmonies of human intelligence (2 volumes, 1846)

External links
 

1798 births
1850 deaths
19th-century French writers
19th-century French diplomats
French male writers
19th-century French male writers